Luis Ignacio "El Tallarín" de la Vega Leija (June 23, 1914 – September 19, 1974) was a Mexican basketball player who competed in the 1936 Summer Olympics.

Born in San Luis Potosí, he was part of the Mexican basketball team, which won the bronze medal. He played five matches.

References

External links
profile
XI JUEGOS OLIMPICOS BERLIN 1936 BRONCE | EQUIPO DE BALONCESTO 

1914 births
1974 deaths
Basketball players at the 1936 Summer Olympics
Mexican men's basketball players
Olympic basketball players of Mexico
Olympic bronze medalists for Mexico
People from San Luis Potosí City
Basketball players from San Luis Potosí
Olympic medalists in basketball
Medalists at the 1936 Summer Olympics